The 2019 Colgate Raiders football team represents Colgate University in the 2019 NCAA Division I FCS football season. They are led by sixth-year head coach Dan Hunt and play their home games at Crown Field at Andy Kerr Stadium. They are a member of the Patriot League.

Previous season
The Raiders finished the 2018 season 10–2, 6–0 in Patriot League play to be Patriot League champions. They received the Patriot League's automatic bid to the FCS Playoffs where, after a first round bye, they defeated James Madison in the second round before losing in the quarterfinals to North Dakota State. Following the season, they were awarded the Lambert Division I FCS Cup by the Eastern College Athletic Conference and the Metropolitan New York Football Writers, signifying the Raiders as the best team in the East in Division I FCS.

Preseason

Award watch lists

Listed in the order that they were released.

Preseason coaches' poll
The Patriot League released their preseason coaches' poll on July 30, 2019 (voting was by conference head coaches and sports information directors). The Raiders were picked to finish in first place, receiving 12 of 14 first-place votes.

Preseason All-Patriot League team
The Raiders led the conference in selections, having ten players picked to the preseason All-Patriot League team. Additionally, Quarterback  Grant Breneman was selected as the 2019 Patriot League Preseason Offensive Player of the Year and Defensive Lineman Nick Wheeler was selected as the 2019 Patriot League Preseason Defensive Player of the Year.

Offense

Grant Breneman – QB

Alex Mathews – RB

Nick Diaco – TE

Jack Badovinac – OL

Jovaun Woolford – OL

Defense

Nick Wheeler – DL

Nick Ioanilli – LB

Abu Daramy–Swaray – DB

Special teams

Chris Puzzi – PK

Abu Daramy–Swaray – RS

Schedule

Game summaries

Villanova

at Air Force

at William & Mary

Maine

at Dartmouth

Lehigh

Bucknell

at Cornell

at Holy Cross

at Georgetown

Fordham

at Lafayette

Rankings

References

Colgate
Colgate Raiders football seasons
Colgate Raiders football